Coleosperma is a genus of fungi in the family Dermateaceae. This is a monotypic genus, containing the single species Coleosperma lacustre.

See also 

 List of Dermateaceae genera

References

External links 

 Coleosperma at Index Fungorum

Dermateaceae genera
Monotypic Leotiomycetes genera
Taxa named by Cecil Terence Ingold